Leonardo Benedetti (born 6 June 2000) is an Italian professional footballer who plays as a midfielder for  club Bari, on loan from Sampdoria.

Club career

Spezia
He was raised in Spezia youth teams and started playing for their Under-19 squad in the 2017–18 season. He was called up to the senior squad during the 2017–18 Serie B season, but didn't make any appearances.

Loan to Sampdoria
On 31 July 2018 he joined Serie A club Sampdoria on a two-year loan. He spent the 2018–19 season with their Under-19 squad.

Sampdoria

Loan to Spezia
On 19 July 2019 his rights were bought out by Sampdoria who immediately loaned him back to Spezia for the 2019–20 season.

He made his professional Serie B debut for Spezia on 21 September 2019 in a game against Perugia. He substituted Matteo Ricci in the 81st minute. That remained his only appearance for Spezia.

Loan to Vis Pesaro
On 17 January 2020 he joined Serie C club Vis Pesaro until the end of the 2019–20 season.

On 28 August 2020 the loan has been extended.

Loan to Imolese
On 3 August 2021 he moved to Imolese on loan.

Loan to Bari
On 12 July 2022, Benedetti moved to Bari on loan.

International career
He made his first appearance representing his country on 9 August 2017 in an Italy national under-18 football team friendly against Slovenia.

References

External links
 

2000 births
Living people
People from La Spezia
Footballers from Liguria
Italian footballers
Association football midfielders
Serie B players
Serie C players
Spezia Calcio players
U.C. Sampdoria players
Vis Pesaro dal 1898 players
Imolese Calcio 1919 players
S.S.C. Bari players
Italy youth international footballers
Sportspeople from the Province of La Spezia